Vaishnavi Ganatra is an Indian television actress. She has appeared on TV shows like Hamari Wali Good News, Rakshabandhan... Rasal Apne Bhai Ki Dhal, Woh Toh Hai Albelaa, Mauka-E-Vardaat, Teri Meri Doriyaann and Naagin 6.

Filmography

Film

Television

Web series

References

External links
 
 

Indian television actresses

Year of birth missing (living people)
Living people